Fact is the second full-length album by Japanese post-hardcore band FACT, and their first on a major label. It is also their first worldwide release.  The only single from the album was "A Fact of Life", for which a music video was made. On the Japanese version of the album, the track "A Fact of Life (Boom Boom Satellites Remix)" does not appear.

Track listing
"Paradox" - 2:44
"Los Angeles" - 2:38
"A Fact of Life" - 3:04
"Chain" - 0:24
"Reborn" - 3:27
"Purple Eyes" - 2:06
"Lights of Vein" - 3:14
"Merry Christmas, Mr. Lawrence" - 3:19
"CO3" - 2:03
"Snow" - 2:51
"Stretch My Arms" - 3:59
"45 Days" - 4:21
"Why..." - 3:23
"1-2" - 1:57
"Rise" - 3:33
"A Fact of Life (Boom Boom Satellites Remix)" - 7:09

Personnel
 Hiro – Lead vocals
 Kazuki – Backing vocals and Rhythm guitar
 Eiji – Drums, percussion
 Tomohiro – Bass, Backing vocals
 Takahiro – Lead guitar, Backing vocals

References

External links
 Amazon.com

2009 debut albums
Fact (band) albums
Avex Group albums
Hassle Records albums
Vagrant Records albums
Albums produced by Michael Baskette